Allan Rayman is a singer/songwriter based in Toronto, Ontario, Canada. He is signed to Communion Music and has released four albums: Hotel Allan (2016), Roadhouse 01 (2017), Harry Hard-on (2018), and Christian (2020), as well as two EPs, Courtney (2017) and Verona's Mixtape (2020).

He promoted the release of Roadhouse 01 with performances for CBC Music's First Play Live Sessions on January 24, 2017, and Billboards Live Sessions on February 23, 2017.

He received a Juno Award nomination for Breakthrough Artist of the Year at the Juno Awards of 2018.

Discography

Albums
Hotel Allan (2016)
Roadhouse 01 (2017)
Harry Hard-on (2018)
Christian (2020)Roadhouse 02 (2022)

EPsCourtney (2017)Verona's Mixtape (2020)Books / Waste My Time (2021)

Live albumsUnplugged at CBC (2017)Live in Minneapolis 12/11/19 (2020)Verona Unplugged'' (2020)

Non-album and non-EP singles
"All At Once" (2016)
"Much Too Much" (2016)
"Poison" (2019)
"Pretty Bug (feat. James Vincent McMorrow)" (2020)
"The Bird & the Cage" (2021)
"Lyla Emily" (2021)

References

Alternative R&B musicians
Canadian male singer-songwriters
Canadian singer-songwriters
Canadian indie rock musicians
Living people
Canadian rhythm and blues musicians
Musicians from Toronto
Year of birth missing (living people)